Turkey took part in the Eurovision Song Contest 1991. The country was represented by a trio composed of İzel Çeliköz, Reyhan Karaca and Can Uğurluer with the song "İki Dakika" written by Aysel Gürel and composed by Şevket Uğurluer.

Before Eurovision

15. Eurovision Şarkı Yarışması Türkiye Finali 
The final took place on 9 March 1991 at the TRT Studios in Ankara, hosted by Bülend Özveren. Fourteen songs competed and the winner was determined by the votes of eight regional juries.

At Eurovision 
On the night of the contest the trio performed 10th in the running order following France and preceding Ireland. At the close of the voting the song had received 44 points placing Turkey 12th. 7 participants had voted for İki Dakika. The Turkish jury awarded its 12 points to Israel.

Voting

References

1991
Countries in the Eurovision Song Contest 1991
Eurovision